TTH Holstebro  is a men's handball club from Holstebro, Denmark. The team is playing in the Danish Primo Tours Ligaen and play their home matches in Gråkjær Arena.

History
The club was founded in May 2000, when Holstebro Håndbold 90 and Tvis KFUM merged their first teams to create the new club.

Previously, the club also had an affiliated women's team until 2020. The club decided to split up the men's and women's section in each clubs, due to the COVID-19 pandemic. HH90 took over the women's section, called Holstebro Håndbold.

Men's handball team

Kits

Results

Danish Handball League:
: 2016
: 2009, 2012, 2014, 2020
Danish Handball Cup: 2
: 2008, 2017
EHF Cup:
: 2013

Team

Current squad

Squad for the 2022–23 season

Technical staff
  Head coach: Søren Reinholdt Hansen 
  Assistant coach: Halldór Jóhann Sigfússon
  Goalkepping coach: Søren Rasmussen 
  Physiotherapist: Morten Graversen
  Physiotherapist: Thomas Graagaard
  Physiotherapist: Rasmus Jørgensen
  Team Leader: Steen Kallesøe
  Team Leader: Mogens Kjær

Transfers
Transfers for the 2022–23 season

 Joining
  Halldór Jóhann Sigfússon (Assistant coach) (from  Selfoss)
  Søren Rasmussen (Goalkepping coach) (from  Ribe-Esbjerg HH)
  Sander Heieren (GK) (from  Drammen HK)
  Mathias Smed (LB) (from  Skanderborg Aarhus Håndbold)
  Miha Žvižej (P) (from  Ribe-Esbjerg HH)
  Dan Beck-Hansen (P) (from  IFK Skövde)
  Sebastian Ørum-Petersen (P) (from  Håndbold Akademi Ikast)

 Leaving
  Andreas Toudahl (Interim Head coach)
  Claus Uhrenholt (Assistant coach)
  Rasmus Lind (Goalkepping coach)
  Ronnie Nicolaisen (GK) (to  Ribe-Esbjerg HH)
  Tobias Bay (LW) (to  Skive fH)
  Jeppe Hauskov (RW) (Retires)
  Anders Flæng (RW) (to  Lemvig-Thyborøn Håndbold)
  Jesper Munk (P) (to  Ribe-Esbjerg HH)

  Mathias Porsholdt (P) (on loan to  Lemvig-Thyborøn Håndbold) (January 2023)

Transfers for the 2023–24 season

 Joining
  Arnór Atlason (Head Coach) (from  Aalborg Håndbold)
  Frederik Bjerre (LW) (from  Mors-Thy Håndbold)
  Thomas Bohl Damgaard (CB) (from  Lemvig-Thyborøn Håndbold)
  Nicolaj Nørager (CB) (from  Fredericia HK)
  Kevin Gulliksen (RW) (from  Frisch Auf Göppingen)
  Jonas Jepsen (LB) (from own rows)
  Jens Kromann Møller (RW)  (from own rows)

 Leaving
  Halldór Jóhann Sigfússon (Assistant coach) (to  Nordsjælland Håndbold)
  Simon Damgaard Jensen (LW) (to  Skive fH)
  Allan Damgaard (CB) (retires)
  Frederik Tilsted (CB) (to  Mors-Thy Håndbold)
  Emil Jensen (CB) (to  Lemvig-Thyborøn Håndbold)
  Christian Jensen (RW)
  Rasmus Kier (RW)

European record

EHF Cup

EHF Cup Winners' Cup

EHF Challenge Cup

Women's handball team

Results

Danish Women's Handball League:
: 2013
: 2015, 2016
Women's EHF Cup: 2
: 2013, 2015
: 2011
Women's EHF Cup Winners' Cup: 1
: 2016

European record

References

External links
 

Danish handball clubs
Handball clubs established in 2000
2000 establishments in Denmark
Holstebro